The La Mouette ZR 250 is a French paramotor that was designed and produced by La Mouette of Fontaine-lès-Dijon for powered paragliding. Now out of production, when it was available the aircraft was supplied complete and ready-to-fly.

Design and development
The ZR 250 was designed to comply with the US FAR 103 Ultralight Vehicles rules as well as European regulations. It features a paraglider-style wing, single-place, or two-place in tandem accommodation and a single  Zenoah G-25 engine in pusher configuration with a 2.5:1 ratio reduction drive and a  diameter two-bladed propeller.

As is the case with all paramotors, take-off and landing is accomplished by foot. Inflight steering is accomplished via handles that actuate the canopy brakes, creating roll and yaw.

In reviewing the ZR 250 Rene Coulon wrote in 2003, "Their range of paramotors is of the same calibre as their other services: serious and functional".

Variants
ZR 250
ZR 250 Bi

Specifications (ZR 250)

References

ZR 250
2000s French ultralight aircraft
Single-engined pusher aircraft
Paramotors